Stephens State Park is a state park in the U.S. state of New Jersey. The park is operated and maintained by the New Jersey Division of Parks and Forestry.

The park includes the remnants of one of the 23 locks, as well as a section of the towpath, of the Morris Canal, built in 1831 to transport anthracite coal from Pennsylvania to New York City.

A  section of the Highland Trail runs through the park. The park is a popular destination for recreational trout fishing. The park offers camping facilities during the summer months.

See also

 List of New Jersey state parks

References

External links

 NY-NJTC: Stephens State Park Trail Details and Info

Parks in Morris County, New Jersey
State parks of New Jersey